The 2022–23 Harvard Crimson Men's ice hockey season is the 122nd season of play for the program. They represent Harvard University in the 2022–23 NCAA Division I men's ice hockey season and for the 61st season in the ECAC Hockey conference. The Crimson are coached by Ted Donato, in his 18th season, and play their home games at Bright-Landry Hockey Center.

Season

Departures

Recruiting

Roster

|}

Standings

Schedule and results

|-
!colspan=12 style=";" | Exhibition

|-
!colspan=12 style=";" | Regular Season

|-
!colspan=12 ! style=""; | 

|-
!colspan=12 style=";" | 

|-
!colspan=12 style=";" |

Scoring statistics

Goaltending statistics

Rankings

*USCHO did not release a week 12 poll.

References

2022-23
Harvard Crimson
Harvard Crimson
Harvard Crimson
Harvard Crimson
Harvard Crimson
Harvard Crimson